Helicase SRCAP is an enzyme that in humans is encoded by the SRCAP gene.

References

Further reading

External links
  OMIM entry on Floating-Harbor syndrome and SRCAP